Megan Fearon (born 29 July 1991) is an Irish former Sinn Féin politician who was member of the Northern Ireland Assembly (MLA) for the Newry and Armagh constituency from June 2012 to January 2020.

She was the party's spokesperson for women, children and young people, and was a government minister in the Northern Ireland Executive.

Career
Fearon was selected by her party to succeed her party colleague Conor Murphy, an abstentionist MP in the parliament of the United Kingdom, who had resigned from the Assembly as part of Sinn Féin's policy of abolishing double jobbing.

Coming from a well-known republican family in Drumintee in South Armagh, at the time of her selection, Fearon had just completed her last year at Queen's University Belfast, where she took a degree in Politics, Philosophy and Economics. Before her selection, Fearon had campaigned for Sinn Féin and had worked to raise mental health and drug awareness. She replaced party colleague Chris Hazzard as the youngest MLA.

Fearon was re-elected in the 2016 election. It was subsequently announced that she is among four Sinn Féin MLAs who will be joining the next Northern Ireland Executive as ministers.

In December 2019, Fearon announced that she was stepping down as a Sinn Fein representative and that while she would remain a political activist, her time in elected politics was over.

References

External links
 NI Assembly website profile of Megan Fearon

1991 births
Living people
Politicians from County Armagh
Sinn Féin MLAs
Northern Ireland MLAs 2011–2016
Northern Ireland MLAs 2016–2017
Northern Ireland MLAs 2017–2022
Female members of the Northern Ireland Assembly
Alumni of Queen's University Belfast
Junior ministers of the Northern Ireland Assembly (since 1999)